Jeremie Van-Garshong is a Ghanaian radio and television presenter, presenting on 4syte TV in the late 2000s, and on Y FM and Live FM radio.

References 

Living people
Ghanaian television presenters
Ghanaian radio presenters
Year of birth missing (living people)